Farzad Farzin (born 24 June 1981 in Tehran, Iran) is an Iranian singer, songwriter, arranger, and actor.

Music career

Early years
Farzad was one of the founders and original band member of the Corouz Group in 2001. He left the band before they could release their first album. Farzad's spot in Corouz was taken by Shervin Sohrabian. Farzad had left Corouz Group for personal reasons, but obviously did keep the rights to all songs he had created for Corouz Group.

Solo career
After many revisions in terms of content, title and record label, he finally was able to release his first (legal) album Sharaareh in 2005 on the Navaaye Raameshe label.

His second (legal) album Shock took quite a while to see the light of day. Originally it was planned for release in 2006, but was postponed. This was mainly due to the fact that his new album(s) were leaked on the Internet prematurely. As a result, he had a hard time publishing and performing his work inside Iran legally. In the meantime he was able to give a couple of European concerts together with Mohsen Yeganeh in the Netherlands and Germany in May 2007. The second album Shock was finally released in 2008.

To avoid the same problems from happening again, Farzad tried to come to some sort of understanding with blogs and pirate websites not to freely distribute songs from his next album directly after its release in stores. For his third album Shaans Farzad was so afraid this it would be leaked and bootlegged that he released the album prematurely on a late afternoon, with a misprinted cover! He was so nervous that he could not sleep for nights. While (legal) music television is non-existent inside Iran, it was quite a novelty that this album was promoted in movie theatres and on VCD/DVDs with a 3-minute music video medley featuring four of the new album's songs.

Late August 2010, he managed to make his European chart debut with the second song Chikeh Chikeh from his third album Shaans and managed to stay there for two weeks with an introduction to his new album. This received high attention in the Iranian on-line media.

Acting career
Farzad Farzin also has a modest acting career. His first role was that of singer in the movie Pesaraane Ajori, directed by Majid Gharizadeh. Many years before that he appeared in many shortfilms as well as the TeleFilm Donyaaye Mahboob, directed by Arsalan Amirhosseini. Farzad Farzin recently starred in a motion picture about an aspiring singer whose biggest dream is to sing a song for the Persian Gulf while standing on a boat. He also featured on the soundtrack.
He also acted in Sag haye poshali and in a serial called Asheghaneh.He is also cast member of Mankan Serial.

Filmography 

 2021: Ahang-e 2 nafare (Director: Arezou Arzanesh)
 2021: Queen of Beggars (TV Series) (Director: Hosein Soheilizadeh)
 2019: Mannequins (TV Series) (Director: Hosein Soheilizadeh)
 2017: Asheghaneh (TV Series) (Director: Manouchehr Hadi)
 2013: Sag-haye poushali (Director: Reza Tavakoli)
 2011: Concert rouye ab (Director: Jahangir Jahangiri)
 2006: Brick Boys (Director: Majid Gharizadeh)

Discography
Farzad released the following albums with a government permit.
Sharareh (Persian: شراره), Navaaye Raameshe (2005)
Shock (Persian: شوک), IranGaam (2008)
Chance (Persian: شانس), Chehreye Khandan (2010)
Shot (Persian: شلیک), IranGaam (2012)
Personal (Persian: شخصی), IranGaam (2014)
Six (Persian: شش), HonareAval (2016)
The following albums were leaked on the Internet before Farzad was able to secure a government permit for official release. As a result, Farzad Farzin did not get the necessary permits and was even barred from publishing any work for a certain period of time.
Chase (Persian: تعقیب)
Threat (Persian: تهدید)
Jazzab (Persian: جذاب), Avaye Doran (2019),(Arrangement By: Hamed Baradaran)
Atish (Persian :اتیش)

Remixes 
Farzad released officially a remix album for his track "Tabestooneh".

References

External links

 
 
 
 Farzad Farzin on Spotify

1981 births
Living people
People from Tehran
Iranian male actors
Iranian pop singers
Singers from Tehran
Iranian male singers
Male actors from Tehran
Iranian male film actors
Persian-language singers
Iranian singer-songwriters
21st-century Iranian male actors
21st-century Iranian male singers